Rakitina Nika (pen name of Ludmila Bogdanova) (born in 1963) is a science fiction and fantasy writer from Gomel, Belarus.

She received the ESFS encouragement award (Belarus) at Eurocon-2008.

Bibliography
 2008. "Gonitwa" (novel)

References

External links
 http://www.fantlab.ru/autor4066 (Russian)

1963 births
Belarusian science fiction writers
Living people